Diminovula caledonica is a species of sea snail in the family Ovulidae, the ovulids, cowry allies or false cowries.

Description
The length of the shell attains 13.4 mm.

Distribution
This marine species occurs off New Caledonia.

References

 Lorenz F. & Fehse D. (2009) The living Ovulidae. A manual of the families of allied cowries: Ovulidae, Pediculariidae and Eocypraeidae. Hackenheim: Conchbooks

External links
 Crosse, H., 1871. Diagnoses Molluscorum Novae Caledoniae incolarum. Journal de Conchyliologie 19: 201-206

Ovulidae
Gastropods described in 1872